Trevor Ryan Lissauer (born October 29, 1973) is an American actor and musician. He is best known for his role as Miles Goodman in  Sabrina, the Teenage Witch.

Career

Acting
Born in Dallas, Texas to a Jewish family, Lissauer began his acting career in 1992 by booking his very first audition which was for the Roger Corman film, The Skateboard Kid. He is best known for playing Miles Goodman on Sabrina, the Teenage Witch from 2000 to 2002.

Music
Lissauer has released two albums on his own to date; his first, self-titled, in 2001, and his second, Transit Plaza, which came out in 2003 and has now been rerelased on iTunes as an album by The Glass Plastiks. He decided that the band he was playing with, made up of Keith Tenenbaum and Barry Whittaker, should have a name and titled them The Glass Plastiks.

The band went through a few changes. Whittaker left and Dimitrios Farougias took over on bass and Chris Null became the lead guitarist. On July 16, 2008 they released "Time to Exist".

Music from the band has been featured in the TV show Nip/Tuck and the DVD release of Party of Five. In 2012, Lissauer resurfaced with a new music project called Animal Cloud with Glass Plastiks drummer Keith Tenenbaum. Animal Cloud is influenced by bands such as MGMT, Empire Of The Sun, Radiohead, Sigur Ros, and M83. Since 2020, Lissauer has been a regular on the podcast Beam Me Up Scotty.

Filmography

Film

Television

References

External links
 

American male film actors
American male television actors
Living people
Musicians from Texas
Male actors from Dallas
1973 births